Matt Vonk (born August 15, 1990) is a professional Canadian football offensive lineman who is currently a free agent. He was most recently a member of the Montreal Alouettes of the Canadian Football League (CFL). He was drafted in the fifth round, 38th overall, by the Saskatchewan Roughriders in the 2013 CFL Draft and signed with the team on May 30, 2013. He played CIS football for the Waterloo Warriors and Wilfrid Laurier Golden Hawks.

Professional career

Saskatchewan Roughriders 
After being drafted by the Saskatchewan Roughriders in the 2013 CFL Draft Vonk was released following training camp and returned to the University of Waterloo to complete his college eligibility. He played wearing a cast as he had broken his hand in a scrimmage early in the season. He returned to the Roughriders in 2014 and made his professional debut on August 2, 2014. In three seasons with the Riders Vonk played in 27 games, starting 9.

Montreal Alouettes 
On June 7, 2017 Vonk was traded to the Montreal Alouettes in exchange for defensive back Denzel Radford. In his first season in Montreal Vonk played in nine games, before tearing his ACL ending his season. Vonk was released by the Alouettes on April 17, 2018 as his knee was not ready for the upcoming season.

References

External links
Saskatchewan Roughriders profile 

1990 births
Living people
Canadian football offensive linemen
Sportspeople from Burlington, Ontario
Players of Canadian football from Ontario
Waterloo Warriors football players
Wilfrid Laurier Golden Hawks football players
Montreal Alouettes players